Somerset Herald of Arms in Ordinary is an officer of arms at the College of Arms in London.  In the year 1448 Somerset Herald is known to have served the Duke of Somerset, but by the time of the coronation of King Henry VII in 1485 his successor appears to have been raised to the rank of a royal officer, when he was the only herald to receive coronation liveries.

By 1525 Somerset was again in private service, on the staff of the Duke of Richmond and Somerset, Henry Fitzroy, although he was appointed by the King and shared the heralds' fees as a herald extraordinary.  On the death of that nobleman in 1536 the herald returned to the service of the crown, and all later officers called Somerset have been members of the royal household as heralds in ordinary.  The badge of office is A Portcullis Or Royally Crowned.  This is a version of the Beaufort badge.

The post is currently vacant.

Holders of the office

See also
 Heraldry
 Officer of Arms

References
Notes

Citations

Bibliography
 The College of Arms, Queen Victoria Street : being the sixteenth and final monograph of the London Survey Committee, Walter H. Godfrey, assisted by Sir Anthony Wagner, with a complete list of the officers of arms, prepared by H. Stanford London, (London, 1963)
 A History of the College of Arms &c, Mark Noble, (London, 1804)

External links
The College of Arms
CUHGS Officer of Arms Index

Offices of the College of Arms